Leporinus arimaspi is a species of Leporinus widely found throughout the Río Orinoco drainage in Venezuela, including the tributaries Ríos Caura, Pamoni, Casiquiare, Manapiare, and Ventuari in South America. This species can reach a length of  SL.

References

Taxa named by Michael D. Burns
Taxa named by Benjamin W. Frable
Taxa named by Brian L. Sidlauskas
Taxa described in 2014
Fish described in 2014
Anostomidae